Demange-Baudignécourt is a commune in the Meuse department in Grand Est in north-eastern France. It was established on 1 January 2019 by merger of the former communes of Demange-aux-Eaux (the seat) and Baudignécourt.

See also
Communes of the Meuse department

References

Communes of Meuse (department)
Populated places established in 2019
2019 establishments in France